Monarch Padma (Bengali: মনার্ক পদ্মা) is a professional franchise field hockey team based in Faridpur, representing the Padma Division. It participates in the Hockey Champions Trophy Bangladesh. Founded in 2022, the team is owned by Shakib Al Hasan. They are one of the six founding members of the country's first ever franchise hockey league. Yu Seung-jin is the current head coach of the team.

History
On 5 September 2022, cricketer Shakib Al Hasan, bought the Faridpur based club, through his company Monarch Mart. Before the league season started, the club announced former South Korean international Yu Seung-jin as the head coach. Ex-Bangladesh national hockey team player, Shahidullah Titu was appointed as the assistant coach.

Roster

Personnel

Current technical staff

References

Sports clubs established in 2022
Bangladesh
Hockey
Field hockey in Bangladesh